Mid Glamorganshire may refer to:

Mid Glamorgan, a historic county of Wales
Mid Glamorganshire (UK Parliament constituency)